Nicol Ross Stephen, Baron Stephen (born 23 March 1960) is a Scottish politician who served as Deputy First Minister of Scotland and Minister for Enterprise and Lifelong Learning from 2005 to 2007. A member of the Scottish Liberal Democrats, he was the Member of the Scottish Parliament (MSP) for Aberdeen South from 1999 to 2011, and was leader of the Scottish Liberal Democrats from 2005 to 2008.

Stephen was elected to the Scottish Parliament in 1999. Following the coalition agreement between the Scottish Liberal Democrats and Scottish Labour, he became Deputy Minister for Enterprise and Lifelong Learning. Later in the same parliamentary term he became Deputy Minister for Education, Europe and External Affairs, and then for Education and Young People. Following the 2003 Scottish Parliament election, he joined the Scottish Executive cabinet as Minister for Transport.

In 2005, following the resignation of his predecessor Jim Wallace, Stephen was elected leader of the party and also became deputy first minister and Minister for Enterprise and Lifelong Learning. He led his party into the 2007 election, where it won 16 seats (down one on 2003). He resigned as party leader on 2 July 2008, triggering a leadership election. In 2011 he joined the House of Lords. He became a patron of The Aberdeen Law Project in 2011.

Background and family life
Born in Aberdeen, he was educated at Robert Gordon's College in Aberdeen and at the University of Aberdeen, where he obtained an LLB in 1980. He then took his Diploma in Legal Practice at the University of Edinburgh School of Law and worked for a number of years as a solicitor before moving into corporate finance as a senior manager with Deloitte & Touche.

He was a former Chair of CREATE (a group campaigning for rail electrification between Aberdeen and Edinburgh); a chairperson of STAR (Save Tor-na-Dee Hospital and Roxburghe House); and the founder and director of Grampian Enterprise.

He is married with 4 children.

Early political career
He was elected to Grampian Regional Council in 1982 (as Scotland's youngest councillor) and was Chair of Grampian's Economic Development and Planning Committee from 1986 to 1991.

He was briefly a Member of Parliament for the Kincardine and Deeside constituency, elected in the November 1991 by-election following the death of Conservative and Unionist Alick Buchanan-Smith. He was a member of the Liberal Democrat treasury team and spokesperson on small business during his time in the House of Commons. The seat returned to the Conservative and Unionist party at the 1992 general election, when it was won by George Kynoch.

He later stood for the Aberdeen South constituency in the 1997 election for Aberdeen South, but was defeated by the Scottish Labour candidate.

Scottish Parliament

Minister and Deputy Minister roles

Nicol Stephen was elected as MSP for Aberdeen South in the first elections to the Scottish Parliament. He later helped negotiate the Partnership Agreement for the coalition government with the Labour Party.

He later served in the Scottish Executive as Deputy Minister for Enterprise and Lifelong Learning (1999 to 2000), then as Deputy Minister for Education, Europe and External Affairs (2000 to 2001), and as Deputy Minister for Education and Young People (2001 to 2003).

Following the 2003 election, he was appointed Minister for Transport. During his time in this post, he was responsible for approving the controversial M74 extension.

Deputy First Minister
Following the resignation of Jim Wallace in May 2005 as leader of the Scottish Liberal Democrats, Nicol Stephen announced his intention to stand for the leadership. He defeated rival candidate, Mike Rumbles, who advocated ending the coalition agreement with the Scottish Labour Party, winning 76.6%, becoming party leader on 23 June 2005. Four days later on 27 June 2005, he was appointed Deputy First Minister of Scotland. Following his leadership victory, a mini-reshuffle of the Scottish Cabinet, saw him take on the role of Minister for Enterprise and Lifelong Learning.

Opposition
Following the 2007 general election, the SNP emerged as the largest party by one seat but short of an overall majority, they held discussions with the Scottish Green Party and also intimated that it would be open to discussions with the Liberal Democrats. However, since the Liberal Democrats had indicated that they would not enter discussions with parties which continued to favour a referendum on independence, no formal talks were held. The SNP became a minority administration and officially entered government on 17 May 2007; Nicol Stephen ceased to be Deputy First Minister and began led his party to the opposition benches.

Despite being out of government, his party worked with the SNP Government on certain issues where they broadly agreed, including replacing the Council Tax with a local income tax to fund a proportion of local government revenue. He developed a reputation among some journalists as an effective and forceful critic of some aspects of the Scottish Government's policy and performance, especially at First Minister's Question Time.

Along with Wendy Alexander and Annabel Goldie, he took his party into the Commission on Scottish Devolution chaired by Sir Kenneth Calman, but was opposed to any suggestion that this would result in powers of the Parliament being returned to Westminster.

Resignation as party leader
On 2 July 2008, Nicol Stephen announced he was stepping down as party leader with immediate effect because of the pressures of leading a political party while having a young family based in Aberdeen, some distance from Parliament in Edinburgh. Nicol Stephen's resignation took many in Scottish politics by surprise, and came only four days after the resignation of the former leader of Labour in the Scottish Parliament, Wendy Alexander. He was succeeded by Tavish Scott.

On 24 September 2010, Nicol Stephen announced he would not be standing again at the Scottish elections in May 2011.

House of Lords
On 2 February 2011, he was created a life peer as Baron Stephen, of Lower Deeside in the City of Aberdeen, and was introduced in the House of Lords on 7 February 2011, where he sits on the Liberal Democrat benches. He said he would use his new position to help reform the House of Lords.

See also
List of United Kingdom MPs with the shortest service

References

External links 
 
 
Nicol Stephen MSP profile at the site of Scottish Liberal Democrats

1960 births
Living people
Deputy First Ministers of Scotland
Leaders of the Scottish Liberal Democrats
Scottish Liberal Democrat MPs
Liberal Democrat MSPs
UK MPs 1987–1992
Members of the Scottish Parliament 1999–2003
Members of the Scottish Parliament 2003–2007
Members of the Scottish Parliament 2007–2011
Members of the Parliament of the United Kingdom for Scottish constituencies
Scottish Liberal Democrat councillors
Scottish solicitors
Alumni of the University of Aberdeen
Alumni of the University of Edinburgh
People educated at Robert Gordon's College
Members of the Scottish Parliament for Aberdeen constituencies
Liberal Democrats (UK) life peers
Life peers created by Elizabeth II
Scottish political candidates
Liberal Democrats (UK) parliamentary candidates